Drillia albicostata is a species of sea snail, a marine gastropod mollusk in the family Drilliidae.

Description
The shell grows to a length of 22 mm. The shell is rose-colored, the longitudinal ribs are white, close-set. There is no spiral sculpture. The aperture is callous above. The anal sinus is rather deep.

Distribution
This species occurs in the demersal zone of the Pacific Ocean off the Galapagos Islands.

References

 Tucker, J.K. 2004 Catalog of recent and fossil turrids (Mollusca: Gastropoda). Zootaxa 682:1–1295

External links
 

albicostata
Gastropods described in 1834